Aggretsuko, also known by its original Japanese title , is a Japanese animated comedy streaming television series based on the eponymous character created by "Yeti" for the mascot company Sanrio. The character first appeared in a series of animated shorts by Fanworks which aired on TBS Television between April 2016 and March 2018.

An original net animation (ONA) anime series adaptation was launched worldwide on Netflix in April 2018, followed by a second season in June 2019, a third season in August 2020 and a fourth season in December 2021. A fifth and final season debuted in February 2023.

A comic book series adaptation by Daniel Barnes and D.J. Kirkland was launched by Oni Press. The first issue was released on February 5, 2020.

A mobile game, Aggretsuko: The Short Timer Strikes Back, was released by Hive for Android and iOS in July 2020. The game, which is available worldwide, includes the full 100 short episode series, which need to be unlocked individually via normal gameplay. Whilst subtitled, the short episodes were not dubbed into other languages.

Plot
Retsuko is a 25-year old and single anthropomorphic red panda, working in the accounting department of a Japanese trading firm, trying her best to navigate through the typical problems encountered by young adults in 21st century Japan. Facing constant frustration every day from pushy superiors and co-workers, Retsuko lets out her emotions by going to a karaoke bar every night and singing death metal. After five years of working the daily grind, Retsuko's misery causes her to undergo a series of events that puts her job in jeopardy, forcing her to shift her relationships with her co-workers and ends up changing her life in unexpected ways. After this, she continues to come up with ways to find happiness, and eventually comes to the conclusion that she would one day like to get married and raise a family. Unfortunately, her social anxiety combined with her timidity often causes her to get involved in more situations than she expects while pursuing her dreams.

In Season 4, the show focused less on Retsuko as the protagonist and more on her colleagues at the office, each with their own unique set of problems.

In Season 5, the show mainly focuses on Retsuko being involved with the Japanese government with her running for a seat on the National Diet, along with Haida's life after quitting his office job and being evicted from his parent's apartment, with him meeting Shikabane; a 21-year-old gamer who has given up on life and is a Net cafe refugee.

Characters

 
 
 A 25-year-old red panda in her company's accounting department who lets out frustrations over her job by singing death metal at a karaoke bar. She is an amiable introvert who suffers from social anxiety, and is prone to unrealistic dreams to the point where it negatively impacts her and those around her. After Retsuko bad-mouths her boss, Ton, on TV, Ton nicknames her "Short-Timer" (Japanese dub) or "Calendar" (English dub), implying her job is on the line. When confronted with a new problem, personal or otherwise, she quickly retreats to a corner and tries to resolve the issue alone, if she does not outright surrender. This shows that her emotional maturity is lacking, and she is reluctant to confide in others. However, she slowly develops a healthier emotional state with help from her friends and, ironically, the co-workers she often cannot stand. By Season 3, she goes fully public with her death metal singing, thus beginning a lucrative side hustle.

 
 
 The domestic pig director of the accounting department, who constantly gives Retsuko a hard time through blatant sexism or overwork. He spends significant time practicing golf instead of working, though it is shown that he is an incredibly skilled and speedy accountant despite being tech illiterate. Though he regularly belittles Retsuko, it is implied that he greatly respects her, and possibly sees her as his successor. He has more than once stepped into her personal life with timely wisdom to save her from situations that are causing her grief. In spite of his toughness, he has a soft spot for his family, and initially hides from them the fact that he was forced to quit his job in Season 4. He is also protective of his workforce, refusing to fire anyone in the accounting department when incentivized to do so by the new president.

 
 
 Retsuko's fennec fox co-worker and closest friend in the office. Highly perceptive and insightful, she is able to deduce anyone's mental state through mere observation of their habits and deviations from their usual patternsnamely, through scrutinizing others' social media. Cynical by nature, she often openly criticizes something only to later enjoy it, sometimes to an obsessive degree. She also has a close relationship with Haida and an unusual rivalry with Tsunoda. She has a highly distinctive, monotonous laugh.

 
 
 Retsuko's mild-mannered, 27-year-old spotted hyena co-worker, who has a crush on Retsuko. His roundabout approach to confessing his feelings puts him in many comical situations; in many ways, he shares the same social anxiety and confidence problems as Retsuko, resulting in poor communication with her. Despite being rejected, he struggles to move on and continues to pine for her, often reacting badly whenever she goes out with someone. However, he does give Retsuko space to keep himself in check, and genuinely cares for Retsuko's well-being and happiness. Haida is an avid punk rock fan, and plays bass guitar. Haida is skilled in programming and IT work, but his work is frequently dismissed by the tech illiterate seniors in Accounting, leaving him frustrated. In Season 4, Haida is suddenly promoted to Accounting Director but later quits the company altogether after being forced to partake in financial fraud.

 
 
 A gorilla lady who works as director of marketing at Retsuko's company. Along with Washimi, she does yoga with Retsuko and eventually joins her in karaoke. Despite her serious nature at work, she is highly excitable and takes great interest in bonding with Retsuko. A running gag with Gori is her over-the-top mourning over failed relationships, usually romantic ones. Despite being 40 years old and incredibly career-driven, she has high hopes to still get married someday and continues to make bold attempts to find "the one."

 
 
 A secretary bird who works as the secretary to the company's CEO, and arguably the company's de facto CEO due to the actual CEO's incompetence. Strong-willed and confident, she is very wise and gives Retsuko a lot of sage advice when she is not busy keeping Gori's excitability in check. She sometimes axe kicks to intimidate those who frustrate her (mostly her boss), embodying the classic hunting behavior of her animal. Though very level-headed, she loses significant composure when the topic of marriage comes up, having gone through a bitter divorce after a four-month long marriage in her past.

 
 
 A perky gazelle coworker of Retsuko who frequently sucks up to Ton in order to remain in a favorable position and to lighten her own workload. Her shameless approach to office politics and social media stardom earns her the ire of many. However, she is highly self-aware and more genuine than her personality lets on. She is an expert on discerning the emotional and mental states of those around her. As the show progresses, she gradually develops a closer friendship with Fenneko.

 
 
 Ton's meerkat right-hand subordinate. Like Tsunoda, Komiya sucks up to Ton, but he appears to be motivated by genuine admiration for Ton while Tsunoda only does so for her own calculated benefits. In Season 3, it is revealed that he runs a popular blog on JPop idols and becomes a big fan of Retsuko after seeing her sing on-stage.

 
 
 A Komodo dragon who is a senior to Retsuko in the accounting department. She is highly condescending and is implied to enjoy watching others fail, usually by giving them one of her many air-tight snack jars to open. Much like Ton, she frequently uses her seniority to push her extra work onto Retsuko. She is implied to have a significant bond with Ton, having worked in the Accounting department for almost as long as he has. Likewise, she is also tech illiterate, and gets defensive when asked to update the way she does her work.

 
 
 Retsuko's hippo chatty coworker. Kabae is a middle-aged woman who frequently runs her mouth as the company's rumor mill. She is easily excited by new gossip but claims to never spread anything malicious. She is happily married to her husband and has three kids at home. Her motherly personality, when applied at work, has polarizing results on the younger workers at the office. In Season 4, she reveals that she has a considerable amount of espionage and stealth skills, showing Retsuko how to sneak around the office building's ventilation shafts.

 
 
 Retsuko's one-time, and oblivious, red panda boyfriend in Season 1, who works in the Sales Department at their trade firm. Nicknamed the "Out of Pocket Prince" (Japanese dub) or "Space Cadet" (English dub), he is constantly zoning out, irresponsible with job duties, soft-spoken, and has zero social awareness. He has a large collection of thriving plants at home, suggesting that his character is a play on the Japanese term "herbivore men".

 
 
 A Japanese badger recent college graduate and a new hire in Retsuko's accounting department beginning in Season 2. He is very happy and eager on the surface, but does not take any kind of feedback lightly, treating it as a personal attack. This causes him to neurotically harass whoever "criticized" him via email demanding a written apology and recording all future conversations with the threat of escalation. As such, his professional and social skills are very lackluster, though his brick wall approach to criticism also renders him immune to the office politics others freely exercise. He is, however, receptive to Kabae's motherly approach, and gradually learns to get along with everyone through her, suggesting that he regularly suffers from extreme anxiety. He is also an excellent cook and later sells his home-cooked meals to his co-workers. In Season 3, he becomes more emotionally stable, having found a girlfriend and writing a cookbook as a side project.

  
 
 A donkey who is briefly Retsuko's boyfriend in Season 2. Initially shown as a lazy, jobless bum, Tadano is actually the founder of his own AI company that is quickly rising in stock and is both incredibly wealthy and intelligent. Tadano's laziness is attributed to the fact that he quickly loses interest in any task he finds mundane, and is driven to bring his AI program to the masses in hopes of moving society past late-stage capitalism, supporting programs like universal basic income. Retsuko slowly falls for the laid-back but driven Tadano after meeting him in driving class, unaware of his true identity, and starts a genuine, happy relationship with him. However, the relationship ends when Tadano revealed that he is not interested in having kids or getting married. Tadano remains a recurring character in later seasons, befriending the people around Retsuko and continues to support her and her friends without asking for anything in return.

 Retsuko's mother
 
 Retsuko's overbearing red panda mother, who is currently unnamed. Beginning in the second season, she regularly visits Retsuko, unannounced, trying to pressure her into marriage with one of many bachelors found via matchmakers. Despite her questionable actions, such as duplicating Retsuko's apartment key without her permission, she genuinely cares about Retsuko's well-being and gives her more opportunities to grow into adulthood by, often under immense emotional pressure, pushing her away from her comfort zone of "work, home, phone, sleep" as well as cooking and cleaning for her when she is visiting.

 
 
 A leopard who is a window washer at Retsuko's building by day and the manager for the up-and-coming idol group "OTM Girls" (short for Ōtemachi) by night. Retsuko initially meets him when she accidentally crashes into his van, forcing her to take up a second job as the group's accounting manager to pay off her debt. When Hyodo inadvertently discovers her singing death metal at her regular karaoke spot, he decides to move the OTM Girls in a pop/metal fusion direction and coerces Retsuko into the center of the group. He is secretive about his day job with the girls, suggesting a sense of shame over it. Though highly aggressive and intimidating, his anger is implied to be a front to cover his feelings about his own failings and incompetence, as he is very poor with finances.

 
 
 The chinchilla lead singer of the OTM Girls. In stark contrast to Retsuko's extremely passive personality, Manaka is confident and brash. She often behaves like a diva, but she genuinely cares for those around her, including Retsuko. Her bold personality comes from the fact that she neither desires nor cares for approval from others, and encourages Retsuko to be less afraid of upsetting others, accident or otherwise. When she is not performing, she's a store clerk at a local convenience store.

 
 
 A Borzoi who works in the General Affairs department at Retsuko's company. Introduced in Season 3, Inui is a sweet, gentle, and caring woman who tries to pursue a relationship with Haida after a chance encounter. Though they initially get off to a good start due to their shared love for punk rock, with Fenneko and Gori both pressuring Haida to accept her, Haida eventually turns her down. Though obviously hurt, Inui gracefully accepts the rejection.

 
 
 A Saluki who is the External Director of Retsuko's company. Introduced in Season 4, Himuro is promoted to CEO after the original CEO is hospitalized. He is very strict and possibly sociopathic, prioritizing obedience and determined to modernize the company at any cost. While his initial methods are financially sound, Himuro unabashedly begins to lay people off from the Accounting Department to save costs, and promotes Haida to Accounting Director. Surrounded by hostile board members who see him as an upstart outsider, Himuro eventually resorts to ordering Haida to cook the books. He quits after being exposed by the other members of the Accounting Department for fraud.

 
 Shikabane, a purple Skunk, is a net-cafe refugee introduced in Season 5. The 21 year-old is a quiet character that seems to have given up on life. Haida and her first met in an online game they were playing. She was playing a male character as previous friends expressed interest in forming relationships after learning she was a girl. After Haida left the net cafe, he tried to encourage her, but to no avail. Eventually, Aggresuko manages to cheer her up a little and she is seen looking for housing by the end of the last episode.

Media

TV anime
A series of 100 one-minute anime shorts directed by Rarecho by Fanworks aired on Tokyo Broadcasting System Television between April 2, 2016, and March 31, 2018, as part of the Ō-sama Brunch television program. Pony Canyon began releasing the shorts on DVD from January 18, 2017.

Mobile game
In July 2020, a mobile game, Aggretsuko: The Short Timer Strikes Back, was released by Hive for Android and iOS devices. The game is a tile-matching puzzle game with the premise that Aggretsuko should begin working to build the furniture on the new company building, similar to games like Gardenscapes. For every ten levels completed, the user can download and see the episodes of the original one minute length TV Anime shorts.

Netflix series
A Netflix original series was announced in December 2017, with Rarecho returning as director and writer at Fanworks. The first season, consisting of ten episodes, was released worldwide on April 20, 2018, with a second season which was released on June 14, 2019. A third season premiered on August 27, 2020. A fourth season premiered on December 16, 2021. A fifth and final season was released on February 16, 2023.

A Christmas special was released on December 20, 2018.

Series overview

Season 1 (2018)

Special (2018)

Season 2 (2019)

Season 3 (2020)

Season 4 (2021)

Season 5 (2023)

Reception

Critical Reception
Aggretsuko was met with critical acclaim in the United States. The series as whole currently holds 8/10 stars on IMDb according to 6.3K ratings.

Season 1
The first season of the Netflix series holds a 100% on Rotten Tomatoes based on 25 reviews, with the sites critic consensus reading, "Uniquely bleak for a Sanrio property, Aggretsuko balances biting corporate satire with adorable characters and absurdist comedy to create a surprising, insightful addition to the world of animation." The season has been praised for its satirical portrayal of Japan's workplace culture, and of the pressures facing Millennial women in the workforce. IndieWire gave the season a B+, and noted the distinctly Japanese stylistic elements of the animation that made it stand out from American productions. The A.V. Club praised Aggretsuko for dealing with mature themes like misogyny and workplace anxiety, but criticized the season's romantic subplot, calling it "aggressively lousy".

Christmas Special
Aiden Strawhun of IGN stated that the special "takes the fun of the first season and spinkles in a smidge of holiday flair" and complimented the special for its commentary on social media addiction, but says it was diminished by "feel[ing] like more of the same" as the preceding season. Polygon writer Allegra Frank called the special "heartwarming" and said that it "deserves to be a holiday classic." Allegra commented on Haida and his infatuation for Retsuko, calling him "the pinnacle of an adorable love interest."

Season 2
The second season holds a 100% on Rotten Tomatoes based on 8 reviews. Caitlin Moore of The Daily Dot wrote that the second season was "less satisfying" than the first, noting how the season focused more on Retsuko's "personal journey," thereby making it less relatable to a general audience, but called the season "fun in the moment." Charlie Ceates of Cultured Vultures said the season has "much of the same charm as its predecessor" but pointed out that the plot progression closely mirrored that of the first season and how the show "may stagnate and get boring" if future seasons did the same.

Season 3
The third season holds a 100% on Rotten Tomatoes based on 5 reviews. Karen Han from Polygon praised the season for tackling "more specific and modern issues," such as parasocial relationships between fans and celebrities on social media, but criticized the season taking a "straight thriller" turn along with the status quo ending for hurting the show's relatability. Jacob Oller from The Spool wrote that the season was "all sorts of fun" and that "Aggretsuko continues to resonate, echoing through the skulls of rage-filled office workers everywhere," while praising the relatability of the anti-capitalist attitude possessed by Retsuko.

Season 4
The fourth season holds a 67% audience rating on Rotten Tomatoes according to 21 reviews. IGN writer Britteny Vincent wrote that Season 4 "brings the absurdity and laughs to the reality of a manipulative workplace" but criticized the dynamic between Retsuko and Haida, referring to them as the two of the show's "most frustrating characters," for diluting the overall experience. Petrena Radulovic of Polygon wrote that the fourth season "should inspire everyone to unionize their workplace," and praised the show's ability to balance "wild scenarios with more specific and relatable situations."

Awards
Aggretsuko was nominated for an Ursa Major Award in the Best Dramatic Series category. The Ursa Major awards are given in the field of furry fandom works and are the main awards in the field of anthropomorphism.

Notes

References

External links
  
 Aggretsuko on Netflix

Related links
 
 

2018 anime ONAs
Comedy anime and manga
Heavy metal television series
Japanese-language Netflix original programming
Fanworks (animation studio)
Netflix original anime
Sanrio characters
Sanrio
TBS Television (Japan) original programming
Toy brands
Workplace comedy television series